Adil Reshi (born 1 February 1989) is an Indian first-class cricketer who plays for Jammu & Kashmir. In November 2013, Rishi scored maiden century in first-class cricket in 14 matches. He was Jammu and Kashmir's highest scorer in the Ranji Trophy in 2013-14.

References

External links
 

1989 births
Living people
Indian cricketers
Jammu and Kashmir cricketers